
Year 272 (CCLXXII) was a leap year starting on Monday (link will display the full calendar) of the Julian calendar. At the time, it was known as the Year of the Consulship of Postumius and Veldumnianus (or, less frequently, year 1025 Ab urbe condita). The denomination 272 for this year has been used since the early medieval period, when the Anno Domini calendar era became the prevalent method in Europe for naming years.

Events 
 By place 
 Roman Empire 
 Emperor Aurelian launches a two-pronged invasion of the Palmyrene Empire, sending his commander Marcus Aurelius Probus to restore Roman rule in Egypt while he marches into Asia Minor. 
 As part of a strategy of clemency, Aurelian spares Tyana after capturing the city. This strategy encourages units under Zenobia to defect to Aurelian.
 Battle of Immae: Aurelian defeats the Palmyrene heavy cavalry (clibanarii) near Antioch. Queen Zenobia flees under cover of darkness to Emesa (Syria).
 Aurelian supports the bishops of Italy in deposing the bishop of Antioch, Paul of Samosata, who had been a supporter of Zenobia. This is the first recorded instance of an imperial intervention in an ecclesiastical dispute.
 Battle of Emesa: Aurelian decisively defeats the Palmyrene army. 
 Aurelian besieges Palmyra. Zenobia attempts to escape to Persia but is captured on the Euphrates. Palmyra surrenders soon after.
 Following a series of trials held in Emesa, Cassius Longinus and other advisors of Zenobia are executed for conspiring against Aurelian.

 By topic 
 Religion 
 Dometius succeeds Titus as Patriarch of Constantinople.
 Saint Denis, first Bishop of Paris, and two of his disciples are beheaded on the road to the Temple of Mercury that stands atop a hill outside of the city. The hill will later be called Montmartre (Mountain of Martyrs) in Lutetia (modern Paris).
 Paul of Samosata is deposed as Patriarch of Antioch.

Births 
 February 27 – Constantine the Great, Roman emperor (d. 337)
 Wei Shuo (or Mouyi), Chinese calligrapher (d. 349)

Deaths 
 Liu Qubei, Chinese prince of the Southern Xiongnu
 Shapur I (the Great), king of the Sassanid Empire
 Sabbas Stratelates, Roman general and martyr
 Sima Fu, Chinese prince and statesman (b. 180)
 Wan Yu, Chinese chancellor and politician

References